The Fashion & Lace Museum (French: Musée Mode & Dentelle, Dutch: Mode & Kant Museum) is a textile and fashion museum in Brussels, Belgium. The museum collections focus on lace, which is a traditional craft in Belgium. It was founded in 1977.

The museum has exhibitions of antique lace, the process of lacemaking, and also hosts temporary exhibits around historical and contemporary fashion. Antique lace exhibitions feature religious vestments and lace from Mechelen and Bruges. Additional exhibits include Barbie fashion and raincoats.

References

1977 establishments in Belgium
Fashion museums
Museums established in 1977
Museums in Brussels
Textile arts of Belgium